To Ji-hun (born August 11, 2003) is a South Korean figure skater. She is the 2015 South Korean Figure Skating Championships junior silver medalist and also 2016 FBMA Trophy novice silver medalist.

Programs

Competitive highlights
JGP: Junior Grand Prix

Detailed results

 Personal best highlighted in bold.

References

Further reading
 
 
 2017 ISU JGP Minsk Entries
 2016 FBMA Trophy Results

External links
 

2003 births
Living people
South Korean female single skaters
People from Seoul